William Drenttel (October 14, 1953 – December 21, 2013) was a designer, author, publisher, social entrepreneur and foundation executive. In 2012, he was the president of Winterhouse Institute, vice president of communications and design for Teach For All, co-director of the Transform Symposium at the Mayo Clinic Center for Innovation, and the recipient of Rockefeller Foundation support to develop models for design and social change. He was president emeritus of AIGA, a fellow of NYU Institute of the Humanities, a senior faculty fellow and social enterprise fellow at Yale School of Management, and the publisher and editorial director of Design Observer, a website covering design, social innovation, urbanism and visual culture. In 2010, Drenttel was elected to the Art Directors Hall of Fame and the Alliance Graphique Internationale, and was the first Henry Wolf Resident in Graphic Design at the American Academy in Rome. He lectured widely in the U.S. and abroad.

He lived in Hamden, Connecticut, with his wife, Jessica Helfand, son, Malcolm, and daughter, Fiona.

Early life and education
Drenttel was born in Minneapolis, Minnesota on October 14, 1953. His family relocated in 1954 to California, where he grew up. He graduated in 1972 from Tustin High School in Tustin, California. From 1972 to 1977, he attended Princeton University, where he received a BA with an Independent Concentration in European Cultural Studies and Film.

Career

Saatchi & Saatchi Compton Worldwide (1977-1985)

Drenttel was a senior vice president, management supervisor at Saatchi & Saatchi Compton Worldwide, where he worked from 1977 to 1985. Over a decade, he managed over 20 different Procter & Gamble brands in the U.S., Canada and Italy. As a management director, he provided strategic leadership in the packaged goods, fast food, and telecommunications categories, managing the launch of the Procter & Gamble Pampers in Italy in 1980 and the AT&T account that launched cellular telephones in America in 1983. In 1984, after the breakup of AT&T, Drenttel won and managed the cellular telephones advertising accounts for two of the regional Bell Operating Companies, Ameritech and Pacific Telesis. His four years of international experience at Saatchi & Saatchi included one year managing P&G Canada accounts and three years as a managing director of Saatchi & Saatchi Italy, during which time agency billings and staff increased five-fold. Drenttel left Saatchi & Saatchi Advertising as senior vice president in 1985.

Drenttel Doyle Partners (1985-1997)

From 1985 to 1997, Drenttel was the president and a partner of Drenttel Doyle Partners, a design company that worked in a wide range of areas, including corporate design, new product development, package design, collateral materials and advertising, marketing consultation, architectural and environmental graphics, and editorial design. Drenttel ran the firm, along with principals Stephen Doyle and Thomas Kluepfel. Drenttel Doyle Partners was first located at 77 Irving Place and then at 1123 Broadway, both in New York City.

Among its accomplishments, Drenttel Doyle Partners made a significant impact on magazine design with its design of Spy Magazine and The New Republic in 1986; designed the identity for the World Financial Center in 1988; launched retail cash machines for Citibank in 1992; repositioned the Cooper-Hewitt Museum as the National Design Museum in 1995; designed Martha Stewart products into K-Mart in 1997; and created graphic identity programs for three national educational institutions: Teach for America in 1994, Edison Project in 1994 and Princeton University in 1996. Additional selected clients over a 12-year period included Brooklyn Academy of Music, Champion Paper, Elektra Records, Farrar Straus & Giroux, HarperCollins, Hewitt Associates, Inc. Magazine, Metropolitan Transportation Authority, Museum of Modern Art, National Audubon Society, The New Republic, Olympia & York, Springs Industries, St. Vincent's Hospital, and Wildlife Conservation Society.

Winterhouse Studio (1997-2012)

In 1997, Drenttel started Winterhouse with his partner, Jessica Helfand. Winterhouse is a graphic design consultancy studio focused on publishing and online media, cultural and educational institutions, and design and social innovation that first operated from 214 Sullivan Street, New York City. In June 1998, the studio moved to Falls Village, Connecticut. From its rural location in northwest Connecticut, Drenttel sought to create a new kind of design practice that innovated how designers participate in large social issues and programs, both nationally and internationally.

Winterhouse Studio initially focused on publishing and editorial development; new media; and cultural, educational and literary institutions. The studio designed Netscape tools, browser and homepage in 1998-1999, University Business in 1998, New England Journal of Medicine in 2000, Legal Affairs, Norman Rockwell Museum in 2002, Berkshire Taconic Community Foundation in 2003, New York University School of Journalism and The Paris Review in 2004, Yale Law Journal and The Poetry Foundation in 2005, The New Yorker in 2007, Archives of American Art Journal, Yale Environment 360 and Teach For All in 2008, and Harvard Law Review in 2010.

Additional clients included Yale University Press, Errol Morris, Stora Enso, Global Centre for the Responsibility to Protect, Smithsonian Archives of American Art, Children's Television Workshop, among others.

Winterhouse Editions (1997-2012)

In 1997, Winterhouse also established its own publishing company, Winterhouse Editions, focused on literature, design and cultural criticism. Books published included works by Paul Auster, Thomas Bernhard, Michael Bierut, Paul Celan, Gloria Feldt, Grolier Club, Jessica Helfand, William Helfand, Siri Hustvedt, Hans Erich Nossack, James Salter, Susan Sontag, Leon Wieseltier and Hanns Zischler. Some works were published under the Winterhouse imprint with the Yale University Press, University of Chicago Press and Princeton Architectural Press. Additionally, Winterhouse published Below the Fold: an occasional journal exploring topics through visual narrative and critical inquiry.

Winterhouse Institute (2006-2012)

Drenttel established Winterhouse Institute in 2006 with the intent to focus on non-profit projects that support design innovation and education, as well as social and political initiatives. In 2011, Winterhouse Institute became a 501c3 non-profit organization.

In 2006, Winterhouse Institute created the Winterhouse Awards for Design Writing & Criticism to increase the understanding of design, both within the profession and throughout American life. A collaboration with AIGA, the $10,000 award (along with additional $1,000 student prizes) recognized excellence in writing about design and encouraged the development of new young voices. After five years of recognizing the best in design writing by authors under 40 in the United States, the competition was discontinued in 2011.

The Polling Place Photo Project was a nationwide experiment in citizen journalism to capture democracy in action: an archive of photographs taken by citizens at polling places on election days. Polling Place Photo Project was launched by Winterhouse Institute in October 2006 before the mid-term elections (in collaboration with AIGA). For the 2008 elections, the project was supported by The New York Times as a part of its political coverage — with photos appearing on the paper's homepage on Election Day, November 11, 2008, when Barack Obama was elected President. In total, over 4,000 photographs were submitted from all 50 states, as well as overseas polling places.

Winterhouse Institute was awarded a $1.5 million grant by the Rockefeller Foundation in late 2008, supporting a three-year project to develop collective action and collaboration for social impact across the design industries. Projects during 2009-2011 included:
 Collaboration with the Yale School of Management to create a new series of case studies focused on design and social enterprise, placing design within the larger context of real world projects and encouraging design thinking as a means to create meaningful social impact. Case studies included SELCO, a solar energy company in India; Mayo Clinic Center for Innovation, a healthcare innovation laboratory in Minnesota; Project Masiluleke, an HIV healthcare project in South Africa, and Teach For All, an international network for education innovation.
 Expansion of Design Observer Group in August 2009 to include Change Observer, Places and Observer Media channels. These channels developed new journalism focused on social innovation, urbanism and design within the public realm. 
 Sponsorship of an Aspen Design Summit in November 2009 in collaboration with AIGA. The summit invited designers, educators, researchers and representatives of NGOs, foundations and businesses to collaborate in addressing large social problems: rural healthcare delivery, early childhood education needs in disaster areas, sustainable food systems, preventative medical healthcare testing, poverty alleviation in rural Alabama, and more. Institutional participants included the Centers for Disease Control, Mayo Clinic, UNICEF, Sustainable Health Enterprises, University of Alabama and Auburn University.
 Sponsorship of a Bellagio Design Symposium, “Reasons Not to Be Pretty: Symposium on Design, Social Change and the ‘Museum,” held April, 2010 at the Rockefeller Foundation’s Bellagio Center in Italy. The symposium gathered 22 designers, historians, curators, educators and journalists to discuss the museum's role in the 21st century in relation to design for social change, asking how museums should collect, archive and exhibit objects of social innovation. 
 Hosted two symposiums on design education that brought together leading educators at the intersection of design and social change to explore the teaching and practice of social design in graduate design education. The first Winterhouse Symposium on Design Education was held at Winterhouse Institute on October 17–19, 2010 with 13 participants from a variety of design and business schools, discussing the challenges of their social-change initiatives. The 2010 symposium concluded with a plan to prototype a standardized method for reporting on social-design academic institutions. The second Winterhouse Symposium on Design Education took place at The Hotchkiss School on August 14¬-16, 2011. Thirty participants continued the conversation, fostering collaborations and building partnerships within the larger design community of schools and universities.

Design Observer (2003-2012)

In October 2003, Drenttel, with Michael Bierut, Jessica Helfand and Rick Poyner founded Design Observer which became the leading international site for design, urbanism, social innovation and cultural observation, providing a forum for critical discussion and commentary. (Poynor ceased being an editor in 2006, but rejoined as a contributing author in 2009.) Drenttel became publisher and editorial director in 2010. Design Observer has been nominated six times for best culture blog and twice for best writing in the (Webby Awards). By the end of 2011, the site had published over 4000 articles and essays by over 500 authors, with over 25,000 comments logged.

Other professional and non-profit affiliations (1997-2011)

Yale School of Management

In 2007, Drenttel became a senior faculty fellow at the Yale School of Management where he taught design communications and thinking. In 2009, he additionally became a fellow of the school's Program on Social Enterprise . During this period, he used Rockefeller Foundation funding to start and support the Case Study Project in Design and Social Innovation, involving four large case studies: SELCO, Project Masiluleke, Mayo Clinic Center for Innovation, and Teach For All (forthcoming 2012).

Teach for All

Drenttel was vice president of communications and design of Teach For All, an international organization supporting educational social enterprises since 2008. Teach For All acts as a global network of independent social enterprises that are working to expand educational opportunity in their nations by enlisting their most promising future leaders in the effort. By 2012, Teach For All was operating in 23 countries.

American Institute of Graphic Arts (AIGA)

Drenttel was president emeritus of AIGA, the largest design organization in the U.S. He led the organization as president from 1994 to 1996, through a period of significant change, including the opening of a new national headquarters in New York City, the appointment of a new executive director, new financial controls, the launch of the organization's first capital campaign, and program coordination with 52 regional chapters. As president emeritus, Drenttel provided ongoing strategic and longterm planning consultation. In 2005, Drenttel assumed the role of national task force director for disaster relief for designers after the destruction of the Gulf States by hurricanes. In 2006, Drenttel initiated the Winterhouse Writing Awards, a national prize for innovation in design writing and criticism. He launched the Polling Place Photo Project, a national project in collaboration AIGA, to photograph American polling places on election days as a part of a citizen journalism initiative. In 2011, he supported the launch of the AIGA social change initiative, Design For Good. Drenttel also served as board member for the New York Chapter of AIGA from 1990 to 1992, and as a national board member from 1993 to 1996.

Cooper-Hewitt National Design Museum. A Smithsonian Institution.

Drenttel was a trustee of Cooper-Hewitt National Design Museum, serving on the board from 1998 to 2009. During his decade-long term, he was involved with executive, strategic planning, collections, and national design awards committees. In 2000, he and Jessica Helfand (with Jeffrey Tyson) designed the identity and trophy for the Cooper Hewitt-National Design Awards, showing design exploration and development.

Academic Partners LLC

Drenttel served as board member and corporate advisor of Academic Partners LLC, a publishing company focused on the higher education marketplace from 1999 to 2002. The company published magazines (Lingua Franca and University Business) and websites, ceasing operations in 2002.

Nextbook Foundation

From 2002 to 2006, Drenttel served as creative director for the Nextbook Foundation, which promoted books illuminating Jewish literature and culture. Drenttel had broad involvement in long-term planning and program development, identity and marketing, design of materials to support national programming, and design of the Nextbook website. (The editorial site was renamed and re-launched in 2009 as Tablet).

The Poetry Foundation

The Poetry Foundation was created through the $200 million bequest of Ruth Lilly to Poetry Magazine.  The Foundation, dedicated to promoting the public appreciation of poetry, is the largest arts organization in America. As creative director from 2004 to 2008, Drenttel had a pivotal role in developing the strategic plan for this new Foundation; broad involvement in long-term planning, program development and marketing; design of all collateral materials to support national programming and Poetry Magazine; and design and development of the Foundation websites. As of 2012, Winterhouse designed nearly 100 covers of Poetry Magazine.

The Grolier Club

Drenttel was a member of The Grolier Club since 1996. Based in New York City, the private club is the oldest existing bibliophilic club in North America.

Poetry Society of America

The Poetry Society of America is the nation's oldest poetry organization, established to create a public forum for the advancement, enjoyment, and understanding of poetry. Drenttel served as board member of the organization from 1993 to 1999, and vice president from 1997 to 1999, where he was responsible for strategic planning and the national expansion of the “Poetry in Motion” program to 20 transit systems nationwide.

Institute for Humanities at New York University

Drenttel was a fellow at the New York University Institute of the Humanities since 2003, an organization that promotes the exchange of ideas between academics, professionals and the general public.

Susan Sontag Literary Foundation

Drenttel served as vice president of the Susan Sontag Literary Foundation since 2007. The Foundation honors talented emerging artists in a variety of disciplines and promotes the international exchange of language and culture in the spirit of Susan Sontag's lifetime commitment to young artistic voices.

Books
 Paul Auster: A Comprehensive Bibliographic Checklist of Published Work 1968-1994, Winterhouse Editions, 1994.
 Graphic Design: New York 2: The Work of Thirty-Six Firms from the City That Put Graphic Design on the Map, with Michael Bierut and D. K. Holland.
 Looking Closer: Critical Writings on Graphic Design, with Michael Bierut, Steven Heller, D. K. HollandAllworth Press.
 "Forty Posters for the Yale School of Architecture" by Michael Bierut, Winterhouse Editions, 2007

References

External links
 Winterhouse Studios (formerly Jessica Helfand | William Drenttel)
 Design Observer (includes short biography of Drenttel).
 Design Observer blog

See also
 First Things First 2000 manifesto
 Emigre 51: First Things First, 1999. 

American graphic designers
Design writers
2013 deaths
1953 births
AIGA medalists